Hany Abdelhady (born 19 May 1980) is an Egyptian Paralympic powerlifter. He won the gold medal in the men's 90 kg event at the 2012 Summer Paralympics held in London, United Kingdom. He also won the gold medal in his event at the 2010 IPC Powerlifting World Championships held in Kuala Lumpur, Malaysia.

He won the bronze medal in the men's 88 kg event at the 2020 Summer Paralympics held in Tokyo, Japan. He also competed in the men's 88 kg event at the 2016 Summer Paralympics held in Rio de Janeiro, Brazil.

In 2021, he won the silver medal in his event at the 2021 World Para Powerlifting Championships held in Tbilisi, Georgia.

References

External links
 

Living people
1980 births
Sportspeople from Cairo
Male powerlifters
Egyptian powerlifters
Paralympic powerlifters of Egypt
Powerlifters at the 2012 Summer Paralympics
Powerlifters at the 2016 Summer Paralympics
Powerlifters at the 2020 Summer Paralympics
Medalists at the 2012 Summer Paralympics
Medalists at the 2020 Summer Paralympics
Paralympic gold medalists for Egypt
Paralympic bronze medalists for Egypt
Paralympic medalists in powerlifting
20th-century Egyptian people
21st-century Egyptian people